Alma Juventus Fano 1906, commonly known as Fano, is an Italian association football club located in Fano, Marche.  The club currently plays in Serie D, the fourth tier of Italian football.

History
The club was founded in 1906 as Società Ginnastica Alma Juventus Fano, named by a professor of Latin "Liceo Guido Nolfi" di Fano.

The first team was called Fanum Fortunae and followed by Emilio Caiani of Milan who imported the not so famous football.

On 13 May 1915, in Circolo di San Paterniano, the city's patron, was born Alma Juventus Football Club among young players.

In 1925 the company raced the first regional championship of Marche, Terza Divisione.

In 1930 was inaugurated the new stadium "Borgo Metauro" now entitled to a player who played in the series of Fano further, Raffaele Mancini.

In 1935 it competed for the first time in Serie C, playing against famous teams such as Venezia, Vicenza, Rimini, Udinese, Treviso, Ancona, Mantova. That year, it also played a game against Milan.

During the fascist, eagle with the beam was the symbol of the team. After World War II the beam was replaced with the coat of arms.

Fano spend many years in Serie C1 and Serie C2, but didn't achieve promotion to Serie B. Some years Fano had been relegated to Serie D.

In the 2008–09 season Fano, which was playing in Serie D, after have been leading the championship for many turns, in the last days was exceeded by Pro Vasto, and finished second in the league, a position that allowed it to play in the playoffs and to participate in the 2009–10 Coppa Italia against Lumezzane.

In the 2009–2010 season the company was repechage in the Lega Pro Seconda Divisione after the failure of some companies. The last three seasons in Lega Pro Seconda Divisione Fano played in this category.

Colors and badge
The club's official color is garnet, a dark red color.

Home stadium
Stadio Raffaele Mancini, (1930–present)
Via Arturo Toscanini, 12, Fano, Italy 61032

The Raffaele Mancini stadium exists since 1930 and hasn't changed much since then. Only the main grandstand received cover and over 500 seats, while to remaining stands, one alongside and one at end-side, remain uncovered terracing.  When opened, it was commonly known as Borgo Metauro, but later adapted the name of Stadio Raffaele Mancini, honoring a player that ended his career with the team.

Squad

Management

 Technical director –  Giovanni Mei
 Head coach –  Marco Alessandrini
 Goalkeeping coach –  Giovanni Bacchiocchi
 Fitness coach –  Massimo Scardovi

References

External links
 Official homepage

 
Football clubs in Italy
Football clubs in the Marche
Association football clubs established in 1906
Serie C clubs
1906 establishments in Italy